Alison Tedstone MBE RNutr FAfN (born April 1961) is Chief Nutritionist (National Director of Diet, Obesity and Physical Activity) at Public Health England (PHE).

Education
Tedstone has a BSc and a PhD degree from the University of London, and conducted research into nutrition at the University of Oxford.

Career
From 2001 she was an academic at the London School of Hygiene & Tropical Medicine.

She joined the Food Standards Agency in 2001, becoming Head of Nutrition Science. In 2010 her role (along with colleagues working on nutrition policy in England) transferred to the Department of Health, and in turn to Public Health England when it was established in 2013.

She became Chief Nutritionist at PHE. Her work includes the National Diet and Nutrition Survey, and she gives evidence to the Scientific Advisory Committee on Nutrition.

Tedstone is a Registered Public Health Nutritionist and a founding fellow of the Association for Nutrition, the voluntary regulator for nutritionists in the United Kingdom.

References

External links
 Government health committee in October 2015

1961 births
Academics of the London School of Hygiene & Tropical Medicine
British nutritionists
British women scientists
Obesity in the United Kingdom
Public Health England
Women nutritionists
Living people
Fellows of the Association for Nutrition